Ice is the solid form of water. 

Ice or ICE may also refer to:

Computing and technology
 ICE (scanning) (Image Correction and Enhancement), for removing surface defects from a scanned photo/image
 In Case of Emergency, emergency numbers stored on a mobile or cellular phone
 ICE (cipher), a block cipher in cryptography
 iCE (FPGA), a programmable logic device family by Lattice Semiconductor
 ICE validation, internal consistency evaluators, a set of tools for validating Windows Installer packages
 IceWM, The Ice Window Manager
 In-circuit emulation, a computer debugging hardware device
 Information and Content Exchange, an XML protocol for content syndication
 Integrated collaboration environment, a platform for virtual teams
 Inter-Client Exchange, an X Window System protocol framework
 Interactive Connectivity Establishment, a mechanism for NAT traversal
 Interactive Creative Environment, a visual programming platform for Autodesk Softimage
 Interactive customer evaluation, form technologies for collecting software user feedback
 Interference cancellation equipment, in radio equipment such as cellular repeaters
 Internal compiler error, a type of compilation error
 International Cometary Explorer, a spacecraft for studying interaction between the Earth's magnetic field and solar wind
 Internet Communications Engine, a computer software middleware platform developed by ZeroC
 Microsoft Research Image Composite Editor, a panorama stitching program
 Information, Communication, Entertainment, an in-flight entertainment system operated by Emirates

Science 
Internal combustion engine, a fuel engine
ICE (chemotherapy), a cancer treatment
Ice giant, a planet composed mostly of gases and liquids other than hydrogen and helium
Caspase 1 or Interleukin-1 beta Converting Enzyme
ICE table (initial, change, equilibrium), a table for tracking chemical reactions
Ice-ice, a disease condition of seaweed
Integrative and conjugative element, a mobile genetic element
Methamphetamine, colloquially referred to as "ice"
4-Methylaminorex, a stimulant drug known as "ice"

Transportation
 Intercity-Express, a German high-speed train
 Ice (yacht), built in Germany in 2005
 In-car entertainment
 InterCity Express (Queensland Rail), a train in Brisbane, Australia
 Iowa, Chicago and Eastern Railroad, US

Organizations

United Kingdom
 Institution of Civil Engineers
 Institute for Creative Enterprise, an institute at Edge Hill University	
 Institute for Creative Enterprises, a part of Coventry School of Art and Design
 The Ice Organisation or MyIce, a sustainable rewards programme

United States
 Information Council for the Environment
 Institute for Credentialing Excellence
 Institute of Culinary Education, an institute in New York City, New York
 Intercontinental Exchange (ICE), Fortune 500 company that operates global exchanges, clearing houses and provides mortgage technology, data and listing services
 Iron Crown Enterprises, a game company, Virginia
 U.S. Immigration and Customs Enforcement
Innovative Concepts in Entertainment

Elsewhere
 ICE - International Currency Exchange, a currency exchange provider
 iCE Advertisements (Insane Creators Enterprise), a digital art group
 Independent Commission of Experts, former name of the investigation into assets moved to Switzerland around the Second World War
 Independent Crown entities, part of New Zealand's Crown entities
 Indonesia Convention Exhibition, a venue in Banten
 Instituto Costarricense de Electricidad, the Costa Rican Institute of Electricity
 The Institute for Cross-cultural Exchange, the Canadian educational charity
 Italian Trade Agency, a government agency focused on fostering international trade of Italian goods and products

Arts, entertainment, and media

Films
 Ice (1970 film), an American drama film by Robert Kramer
 Ice (1998 film), a made-for-TV disaster movie
 Ice (2003 film), a Tamil film by Raghuraj
 Ice (2018 film), a Russian film

Literature
 Ice (Dukaj novel) (2007), by Jacek Dukaj
 Ice (Durst novel) (2009), by Sarah Beth Durst, a modernization of the fairy tale "East of the Sun and West of the Moon"
 Ice (Johnson novel) (2002), by Shane Johnson
 Ice (Kavan novel) (1967), by Anna Kavan
 Ice (Nowra novel) (2008), by Louis Nowra
 Ice (Sorokin novel) (2002), by Vladimir Sorokin
 Ice, a 1978 novel by James Follett
 Ice, a 1983 novel by Ed McBain in the 87th Precinct series
 Ice, a 2011 novel by Sonallah Ibrahim
 International Corpus of English, a set of text corpora representing varieties of English around the world

Music

Groups and labels
 Ice (band), a British band who recorded in the 1990s
 Ice Records, a record label
 International Contemporary Ensemble, an American classical music group
 Lafayette Afro Rock Band or Ice, a France-based American funk band

Songs
 "Ice" (Kelly Rowland song)
 "Ice" (Lights song)
 "Ice" (The Rasmus song)
 "Ice" (The Ritchie Family Song)
 "Ice" (Morgenshtern Song)
 "Ice", by Camel from I Can See Your House from Here
 "Ice", by Sarah McLachlan from Fumbling Towards Ecstasy
 "Ice", by Spirit from Clear

Television
 Ice (British TV series), a 2011 British 2-episode drama serial
 Ice (American TV series), a 2016–2018 American series for Audience Network
 "Ice" (The X-Files), an episode of The X-Files
 "I.C.E", an episode of Sirens
 "Ice", an episode of Alias

Other uses in arts, entertainment, and media
 ICE (anime), a 2007 original video animation
 Ice (character), a DC comic book superheroine
 Ice (webcomic), a Canadian graphic novel series

People with name
 George Gervin or Ice (born 1952), American basketball player
 Logan Ice (born 1995), American baseball player
 Thomas Ice, executive director of the Pre-Trib Research Center, a Christian "think-tank"

Other uses
 Ice, Kentucky, an unincorporated community
 Ice, slang for one or more diamonds
 Iceland, UNDP country code
 Intrusion Countermeasures Electronics, a phrase used in cyberpunk literature
 Inventory of Conflict and Environment, a research project at American University's School of International Service

See also
 Iceberg (disambiguation)
 Iceman (disambiguation)
 Ices (disambiguation)
 Ice Cube (born 1969), American rap musician and actor
 Ice-T (born 1958), American rap musician and actor
 ISIS, the Islamic State of Iraq and the Levant
 Vanilla Ice (born 1967), American rapper